Stegastes imbricatus, commonly called the Cape Verde gregory, is a damselfish of the family Pomacentridae. It is native to the tropical eastern Atlantic Ocean.

Distribution and habitat
Stegastes imbricatus is native to the tropical eastern Atlantic Ocean. Its range extends from Senegal to Angola, and it also occurs around the Canary Islands, Cape Verde and several islands in the Gulf of Guinea. Its maximum length is 10 cm.

History
It was first described in 1840 by the English naturalist Leonard Jenyns after a specimen collected in Praia Harbor, Cape Verde, by Charles Darwin on his journey with HMS Beagle.

References

Further reading

Allen, G.R. 1991: Damselfishes of the world. Mergus Publishers, Melle, Germany. 271 pp.

imbricatus
Fish described in 1840
Fish of the East Atlantic